C road may refer to:

 In Malaysia, Malaysian State Roads system, in Pahang
 In Namibia, C roads in Namibia
 In Great Britain, Great Britain road numbering scheme#Other classifications
 In the Isle of Man, List of roads on the Isle of Man#"C" roads
 In the United States:
 C-Road, California, a census-designated place in Plumas County
 Colorado State Highway 470, the only Colorado route to use the label
 County-designated highways in zone C in Michigan
 Corridor C, part of the Appalachian Development Highway System